The Men's 200 Freestyle event at the 10th FINA World Aquatics Championships swam on 21–22 July 2003 in Barcelona, Spain. Preliminary and Semifinal heats were on 21 July, while the Final swam on 22 July.

Prior to the start of the event, the existing World (WR) and Championship (CR) records were both:
WR and CR: 1:44.06 swum by Ian Thorpe (Australia) on 25 July 2001 in Fukuoka, Japan

Results

Final

Semifinals

Preliminaries

References

Swimming at the 2003 World Aquatics Championships